The 1906–07 Kentucky State men's basketball team competed on behalf of the University of Kentucky during the 1906–07 season. The team finished with a final record of 3–9.

Roster

Schedule

|-
!colspan=12 style="background:#273BE2; color:white;"| Regular Season

References

Kentucky
Kentucky Wildcats men's basketball seasons
1906 in sports in Kentucky
1907 in sports in Kentucky